The City and Borough of Yakutat (Tlingit: Yaakwdáat) is a borough in the U.S. state of Alaska and the name of a former city within it. The name in Tlingit is Yaakwdáat (meaning "the place where canoes rest"). It derives from an Eyak name, diyaʼqudaʼt, and was influenced by the Tlingit word yaakw ("canoe, boat").

The borough covers an area about six times the size of the U.S. state of Rhode Island, making it one of the largest counties (or county equivalents) in the United States. As of the 2020 census, the population was 662, same number as previous census. As of 2010, it was Alaska's least populous borough or census area, and the ninth-least populous county nationwide. The population had declined from 680 in 2000.

The Borough of Yakutat was incorporated as a non-unified Home Rule Borough on September 22, 1992. Yakutat was previously a city in the Skagway–Yakutat–Angoon Census Area (afterwards renamed as the Skagway–Hoonah–Angoon Census Area).

The U.S. Census Bureau has defined the former City of Yakutat as a census-designated place within the borough. The only other significant population center in the borough is the community of Icy Bay, the site of the Icy Bay Airport, in the west-central part of the borough.

History

The original settlers in the Yakutat area are believed to have been Eyak-speaking people from the Copper River area.  Tlingit people migrated into the area and  assimilated the Eyak before the arrival of Europeans in Alaska. Yakutat was only one of a number of Tlingit and mixed Tlingit-Eyak settlements in the region. The others have been depopulated or abandoned.

In the eighteenth and nineteenth centuries, English, French, Spanish and Russian explorers came to the region. The Shelikhov-Golikov Company, precursor of the Russian-American Company, built a fort in Yakutat in 1795 to facilitate trade with the Alaska Natives in  sea-otter pelts. The settlement became known as New Russia, Yakutat Colony, or Slavorossiya. When the Russians cut off access to the fisheries nearby, a Tlingit war party attacked and destroyed the fort in 1805.

By 1886, after the 1867 Alaska Purchase by the United States from the Russian Empire, the black sand beaches in the area were being mined for gold. In 1889 the  Swedish Free Mission Church opened a school and sawmill in the area.

From 1903 the Stimson Lumber Company constructed a cannery, another sawmill, a store, and a railroad. Many people moved to the current site of Yakutat to be closer to work at the Stimson cannery, which operated through 1970.

During World War II, the USAAF stationed a large aviation garrison near Yakutat and built a paved runway. The troops were withdrawn after the war. The runway is still in use as Yakutat Airport, which offers scheduled airline service.

Fishing is the largest economic activity in Yakutat.

In 2004 the Yakutat Tlingit Tribe (YTT) received a Language Preservation Grant from the Administration for Native Americans. With this, they have reinvigorated their efforts to teach the Tlingit language to middle-aged and young people. YTT received another ANA grant in 2007 and is expanding its role in the schools. All the YTT Tlingit language revitalization work focuses on using  communicative approaches to second-language teaching, such as TPR and American Sign Language (ASLA).

While working at a local cannery from 1912 to 1941, Seiki Kayamori extensively photographed Yakutat and its area; Yakutat City Hall holds a large set of prints of his work.

Yakutat and Southern Railway was a rail operation in the area. It served several canneries south of Yakutat and primarily hauled fish to the harbor. Service ended in the mid-1960s.

Geography

It lies in an isolated location in lowlands along the Gulf of Alaska) northwest of Juneau.

Yakutat borders the Gulf of Alaska to the west, Valdez-Cordova Census Area, Alaska to the northwest, Hoonah-Angoon Census Area, Alaska to the southeast, Stikine Region, British Columbia to the northeast-east and Yukon Territory to the north.

The borough contains part of the protected areas of Chugach National Forest, Glacier Bay National Park, Glacier Bay Wilderness, Tongass National Forest, Wrangell-St. Elias National Park and Preserve, Wrangell-Saint Elias Wilderness and the Russell Fjord Wilderness.

One unique feature in the Borough is Hubbard Glacier, North America's largest tidewater glacier. In 1986 and 2002, the glacier blocked the entrance to Russell Fjord. The resulting Russell Lake rose  and  until the glacial dam failed. This will have a major impact on a world-class fishery. Yakutat will not be impacted unless the glacier advances to the townsite, which could take a thousand years. The vegetation in the area indicates that water was flowing over the pass until about 1860.

Climate
Yakutat has a subarctic climate (Dfc) with characteristics such as high precipitation, absence of permafrost and temperate rainforest vegetation of the climate zone of the Pacific Coast. On average, the year's driest period is late April through July, though no month qualifies as a true "dry season." Unlike in South Central Alaska, a day with a high temperature under  has never been recorded.

Notes

Demographics

Yakutat first appeared on the 1880 U.S. Census as an unincorporated Tlingit-Yakutat village. All 300 residents were listed as Tlingit. In 1890, it reported 308 residents, and this included the populations of the native villages at Dry Bay & Lituya (Bay). 300 were listed as Native, 7 Whites and 1 Creole (Mixed Russian & Native). It continued to report on every successive census. In 1948, Yakutat formally incorporated. In 1992, it broke away from the Skagway-Yakutat-Angoon Census Area to form its own borough of Yakutat. It disincorporated at its formation and became a census-designated place (CDP).

2010 Census
At the 2010 census, there were 662 people, 502 households, and 201 families residing in the Yakutat. The racial makeup was 50.37% White, 0.12% Black or African American, 39.60% Native American, 1.24% Asian, 0.74% Pacific Islander, and 7.92% from two or more races. Hispanic or Latino of any race were 0.74% of the population.

5.78% reported speaking Tlingit at home.

Of the 265 households, 32.8% had children under the age of 18 living with them, 38.5% were married couples living together, 12.1% had a female householder with no husband present, and 40.0% were non-families. 32.1% of households were one person, and 4.9% were one person aged 65 or older. The average household size was 2.59 and the average family size was 3.30.

The population was spread out, with 28.1% under the age of 18, 5.3% from 18 to 24, 32.5% from 25 to 44, 28.7% from 45 to 64, and 5.3% 65 or older. The median age was 37 years. For every 100 females, there were 145.6 males. For every 100 females age 18 and over, there were 161.7 males.

The median household income was in Yakutat was $46,786, and the median family income was $51,875. Males had a median income of $41,635 versus $25,938 for females. The per capita income was $22,579.  About 11.8% of families and 13.5% of the population were below the poverty line, including 22.5% of those under age 18 and 8.3% of those age 65 or over.

2000 Census
At the 2000 census, central Yakutat was treated as a census-designated place (CDP), even though census-designated places "are not legally incorporated under the laws of the state in which they are located."

At the 2000 census, there were 680 people, 261 households, and 157 families in the CDP. The population density was 6.8 people per square mile (2.6/km2). There were 385 housing units at an average density of 3.9 per square mile (1.5/km2). The racial makeup of the CDP was 41.47% White, 0.15% Black or African American, 47.06% Native American, 1.47% Asian, 0.88% Pacific Islander, and 8.97% from two or more races. Hispanic or Latino of any race were 0.88% of the population.

Of the 261 households, 33.3% had children under the age of 18 living with them, 38.7% were married couples living together, 12.3% had a female householder with no husband present, and 39.5% were non-families. 31.4% of households were one person, and 5.0% were one person aged 65 or older.  The average household size was 2.61 and the average family size was 3.30.

The age distribution was 31.0% under the age of 18, 6.2% from 18 to 24, 31.3% from 25 to 44, 25.7% from 45 to 64, and 5.7% 65 or older. The median age was 35 years. For every 100 females, there were 117.3 males. For every 100 females age 18 and over, there were 123.3 males.

The median household income was $47,054 and the median family income was $51,875. Males had a median income of $42,404 versus $26,875 for females. The per capita income for the CDP was $21,330. About 11.8% of families and 15.7% of the population were below the poverty line, including 22.5% of those under age 18 and 10.7% of those age 65 or over.

Notable people 

 Alexander Andreyevich Baranov, (1747-1819), founded a Russian settlement at Yakutat Bay
 Alison Bremner, Tlingit contemporary artist born in Yakutat
 Byron Mallott, (1943-2020), mayor of Yakutat
 Martin Sensmeier, (born 1985), actor
 X'unéi, (late 18th-century), chief of the Tlingit

See also

 Yakutat Airport
 1899 Yakutat Bay earthquakes

References

External links

 City and Borough of Yakutat website
 Yakutat Alaska Chamber of Commerce
 Summary of the 2006 Yakutat area commercial salmon fisheries / by Gordon F. Woods. Hosted by the Alaska State Publications Program.

Alaska boroughs
Former cities in Alaska
Populated coastal places in Alaska on the Pacific Ocean
 
1992 establishments in Alaska
Populated places established in 1795
Census-designated places in Alaska